Eugen Iordache (30 April 1922 – 22 February 1988) was a Romanian footballer and manager. He competed in the men's tournament at the 1952 Summer Olympics.

Honours

Player
Progresul București
Divizia B: 1954

Coach
Jiul Petroșani
Cupa României Runner-up: 1971–72

References

External links

1922 births
1988 deaths
Romanian footballers
Romanian football managers
Romania international footballers
Olympic footballers of Romania
Footballers at the 1952 Summer Olympics
Liga I players
Liga II players
FC Petrolul Ploiești players
FC Progresul București players
CA Oradea players
FC Rapid București players
CFR Cluj managers
FC Progresul București managers
CSM Jiul Petroșani managers
Footballers from Bucharest
Association football forwards